Ralph Battell, D.D. (1649–1713) was an English divine.

Battell was the son of Ralph Battell, M.A., rector of All Saints' and St. John's, Hertford. was born on 11 April 1649, and received his education at Peterhouse, Cambridge (B.A., 1669; M.A., 1673; D.D., comitiis regiis, 1705). He became rector of St. Peter's Church, Canterbury, and of Edworth, Bedfordshire; subdean of the Chapel Royal; sub-almoner to Queen Anne; and prebendary of Worcester (1680).

He died on 20 March 1712–13, and was buried in the cemetery of All Saints', Hertford. There is a mezzotint engraving of him by J. Simon from a painting by Michael Dahl.

Works
 Vulgar Errors in Divinity removed, London, 1683, 8vo. William Haworth, in his Absolute Election of Persons, not upon foreseen conditions, stated and maintained (London, 1694, 4to), criticised the ‘Pelagian errors' contained in this book. 
 A Sermon on Matt. vii. 12, 1684, 4to. 
 The Lawfulness and Expediency of Church-Musick asserted, in a sermon on Ps. c. 1, 2, London, 1694, 4to.

References

1649 births
1713 deaths
17th-century English theologians
18th-century English Christian theologians
17th-century English Anglican priests
People from Hertford
Alumni of Peterhouse, Cambridge
English Christian religious leaders

17th-century Anglican theologians
18th-century Anglican theologians